XHLD-FM is a radio station on 103.9 FM in Autlán de Navarro, Jalisco. It is known as Radio Costa.

History
XELD-AM received its concession (a broadcast license) on October 22, 1962. It was owned by Ernesto Medina Lima and broadcast on 1240 kHz with 1,000 watts day and 100 night. In 1972, it was transferred to XELD Radio Autlán.

In the 1980s, XELD moved to 780 kHz with 5,000 watts.

XELD was authorized for AM-FM migration in 2012.

References

Radio stations in Jalisco
Radio stations in Mexico with continuity obligations